
CJK Unified Ideographs Extension H is a Unicode block containing rare and historic CJK Unified Ideographs for Chinese, Japanese, Korean, Sawndip, and Vietnamese.

Block

History
The following Unicode-related documents record the purpose and process of defining specific characters in the CJK Unified Ideographs Extension H block:

References

Unicode blocks